The practice of whaling in South Africa gained momentum at the start of the 19th century and ended in 1975. By the mid-1960s, South Africa had depleted their population of fin whales, and subsequently those of sperm and sei whales, and had to resort to hunting the small and less-profitable minke whale. Minke whales continued to be caught and brought to the Durban whaling station from 1968 until 1975. South Africa comprehensively banned whaling in 1979.

References

External links

 
Economic history of South Africa
Environment of South Africa